The Tucson Botanical Gardens is a 5.5 acre (2.2 ha) collection of sixteen residentially scaled urban gardens in Tucson, Arizona, United States. Paths connect these gardens, which include a Zen Garden, a Prehistoric Garden, a Barrio Garden, a Butterfly Garden, a Xeriscape Garden, and a Children’s Garden. 

The Cox Butterfly & Orchid Pavilion is home to orchids, bromeliads, and jungle vegetation, along with a display of live tropical butterflies from five continents from October to April. The Cactus and Succulent Garden contains hundreds of cacti and arid plants arranged to imitate the arid Sonoran desert, and is embellished with exotic stones and minerals collected by the Gardens’ founder, Harrison Yocum. The Native Crops Garden illustrates the prehistoric agricultural practices in Central and Southern Arizona. The Tohono O’odham Path winds among edible and utilitarian plants of the Sonoran Desert.

History
The Tucson Botanical Gardens were founded in 1964, by horticulturist and collector Harrison G. Yocum. The gardens were originally located at his home on North Jefferson Street, and contained an extensive collection of cacti and palms open to the public. Memberships became available in 1968, and the group became chartered as a non-profit corporation the next year. After the organization grew to over 100 charter members, it moved to the Randolph Park, where it used available greenhouse display space.

After growing further, the group was looking for a larger location to move the gardens to. Mrs. Bernice Porter, the owner of the grounds of the former Desert Gardens Nursery garden, was looking for a way to preserve her house and gardens from demolition. In 1974, the grounds became the new headquarters of the Tucson Botanical Gardens after the Tucson City Council passed Resolution 9384, which stated that the property could be used for the development of a botanical garden.

The house has undergone extensive remodeling to allow it to be more suitable for the library and the administrative offices of the Tucson Botanical Gardens. Many rooms, however, including the Porter Hall, retain the original look of the Porter family house.

See also 
List of botanical gardens and arboretums in Arizona

References

Botanical gardens in Arizona
Culture of Tucson, Arizona
Butterfly houses